Magic Bytes is an international video game publishing label. It originated in Germany as the primary computer game brand of micro-partner Software GmbH, already active since 1986 and dedicated to the internal development of some of the games. Initially, Bertelsmann subsidiary Ariolasoft and Gremlin Graphics in the United Kingdom distributed most Magic Bytes games.

History 
Micro-Partner was founded by Thomas Meiertoberens, coming from Rainbow Arts of which he was co-founder, in 1986 in Gütersloh, Germany. At that time the initial team was formed by the owner Meiertoberens, the programmer Rolf Lakämper and the graphic designer Bettina Wiedner, all three in their twenties, and made itself known with the success of Mission Elevator, published in different countries of the world, the first German video game to have notable international success. In 1986, Meiertoberens obtained licenses to produce and market video games in Europe of comic characters Clever & Smart, Pink Panther and Tom & Jerry. The Magic Bytes brand was created in 1987 and was subsequently used to publish almost all micro-partner's games. Magic Bytes debut took place in 1987 with the European release of Western Games and Clever & Smart. Most games were adapted for Amstrad CPC, Atari ST, Commodore C64 & Amiga, some for MSX, ZX Spectrum and later mostly for PC's.

On May 20, 1988, Meiertoberens founded an US counterpart, Magic Bytes USA Inc., in Tampa and agreed with US company Digitek, also in Tampa, to mutually publish the other company's titles on their continent and micro-partner published Digitek games in Europe under the Magic Bytes label.

In 1991, micro-partner ceased operations due to non-payment of some of their wholesalers and publishing rights for Magic Bytes games changed to Magic Bytes Verlag R. Kleinegräber in German speaking countries and Magic Bytes Verlag started selling video games directly to end-users by mail-order or to Karstadt department stores. Magic Bytes Verlag started publishing video games from external German game developers and had notable success in Germany with BIING from reLINE in 1993 and Have a N.I.C.E. day from Synetic in 1997. In 2000, the last Magic Bytes game was released for that time period.

In 2017, Thomas Meiertoberens, who in the meantime had moved to the United States in 1997 to manage a real estate company, brought the brand back into business by founding Magic Bytes LLC, of which he is CEO. The new US company, headquartered in Lewes and operating with representatives in Orlando and Bielefeld, Germany, is developing an Android game called Toonworld of which an early access version has been released in February 2021.

Games

References

External links 
 

Video game companies established in 1986
Video game companies of Germany
Video game development
Video game publishers